Oanță or Oantă is a surname. Notable people with the surname include:

Ilie Oantă (born 1950), Romanian rower
Iolanda Oanță (born 1965), Romanian track and field athlete

Romanian-language surnames